In atomic physics, Doppler broadening is broadening of spectral lines due to the Doppler effect caused by a distribution of velocities of atoms or molecules. Different velocities of the emitting (or absorbing) particles result in different Doppler shifts, the cumulative effect of which is the emission (absorption) line broadening.
This resulting line profile is known as a Doppler profile. A particular case is the thermal Doppler broadening due to the thermal motion of the particles. Then, the broadening depends only on the frequency of the spectral line, the mass of the emitting particles, and their temperature, and therefore can be used for inferring the temperature of an emitting (or absorbing) body being spectroscopically investigated.

Derivation 

When a particle moves (e.g., due to the thermal motion) towards the observer, the emitted radiation is shifted to a higher frequency. Likewise, when the emitter moves away, the frequency is lowered. For non-relativistic thermal velocities, the Doppler shift in frequency is

 

Since there is a distribution of speeds both toward and away from the observer in any volume element of the radiating body, the net effect will be to broaden the observed line. If  is the fraction of particles with velocity component  to  along a line of sight, then the corresponding distribution of the frequencies is

 

Therefore,

We can also express the broadening in terms of the wavelength . Recalling that in the non-relativistic limit , we obtain

In the case of the thermal Doppler broadening, the velocity distribution is given by the Maxwell distribution
 

Then

 

We can simplify this expression as

 

which we immediately recognize as a Gaussian profile with the standard deviation

 

and full width at half maximum (FWHM)

Applications and caveats 

In astronomy and plasma physics, the thermal Doppler broadening is one of the explanations for the broadening of spectral lines, and as such gives an indication for the temperature of observed material. Other causes of velocity distributions may exist, though, for example, due to turbulent motion. For a fully developed turbulence, the resulting line profile is generally very difficult to distinguish from the thermal one.
Another cause could be a large range of macroscopic velocities resulting, e.g., from the receding and approaching portions of a rapidly spinning accretion disk. Finally, there are many other factors that can also broaden the lines. For example, a sufficiently high particle number density may lead to significant Stark broadening.

Doppler broadening can also be used to determine the velocity distribution of a gas given its absorption spectrum. In particular, this has been used to determine the velocity distribution of interstellar gas clouds.

Doppler broadening, the physical phenomenon driving the Fuel temperature coefficient of reactivity also been used as a design consideration in high-temperature nuclear reactors. In principle, as the reactor fuel heats up, the neutron absorption spectrum will broaden due to the relative thermal motion of the fuel nuclei with respect to the neutrons. Given the shape of the neutron absorption spectrum, this has the result of reducing neutron absorption cross section, reducing the likelihood of absorption and fission. The end result is that reactors designed to take advantage of Doppler broadening will decrease their reactivity as temperature increases, creating a passive safety measure. This tends to be more relevant to gas-cooled reactors, as other mechanisms are dominant in water cooled reactors.

Saturated absorption spectroscopy, also known as Doppler-free spectroscopy, can be used to find the true frequency of an atomic transition without cooling a sample down to temperatures at which the Doppler broadening is negligible.

See also
 Mössbauer effect
 Dicke effect

References

Doppler effects
Physical phenomena